Bayhead is a community in the Canadian province of Nova Scotia, located in  Colchester County. It is located at the head of Tatamagouche Bay, and geographic features in the area are historically associated with the name Gouzar.

References

Communities in Colchester County
General Service Areas in Nova Scotia